Wang Liuyi (born 16 January 1997) is a Chinese synchronised swimmer. She won a gold medal (China's first ever) and a silver medal at the 2017 World Aquatics Championships. She also won a team gold medal at the 2018 Asian Games and a duet-free gold medal at the 2018 World Series.

She is the elder twin sister of Wang Qianyi who is also her teammate.

References
集体自由组合高分加冕 中国花游首夺世锦赛冠军！
这对“姐妹花”世锦赛夺冠归来 深圳这个区都为之沸腾了！
2018 Asian Games Results
Chinese sister duo crowned in Duet Free at FINA Synchronized Swimming World Series Paris leg

Living people
Chinese synchronized swimmers
1997 births
World Aquatics Championships medalists in synchronised swimming
Synchronized swimmers at the 2017 World Aquatics Championships
Chinese twins
Sportspeople from Shenzhen
Synchronized swimmers from Guangdong
Asian Games gold medalists for China
Medalists at the 2018 Asian Games
Artistic swimmers at the 2018 Asian Games
Asian Games medalists in artistic swimming
Artistic swimmers at the 2022 World Aquatics Championships
20th-century Chinese women
21st-century Chinese women